Damian Rosales (born November 11, 1991) is a soccer player, formerly for Arizona United in the United Soccer League. Born in Mexico, he has previously represented the United States national under-17 team.

Career

College and amateur
Rosales played four years of college soccer at Southern Methodist University between 2010 and 2014, including a red-shirted year in 2010.

In his final year at college, Rosales played with Premier Development League side Austin Aztex.

Professional
Rosales signed with United Soccer League side Arizona United on March 28, 2015.

References

External links
 

1991 births
Living people
American soccer players
American sportspeople of Mexican descent
SMU Mustangs men's soccer players
Austin Aztex players
Phoenix Rising FC players
USL League Two players
USL Championship players
Fresno City College alumni
Soccer players from Texas
Footballers from Guanajuato
Mexican footballers
Association football defenders